Dahm is a surname. Notable people with the surname include:

 Britta Dahm (born 1968), German breaststroke swimmer
 Daniel Dahm (born 1969), German geographer and ecologist
 Fredrik Dahm (born 1982), Norwegian footballer
 Helen Dahm (1878–1968), Swiss artist
 Jan Dahm (1921–2013), Norwegian resistance member during World War II
 Mads Dahm (born 1988), Norwegian footballer
 Nathan Dahm (born c. 1983), American politician from Oklahoma
 Paul Dahm (born 1951), Luxembourgish composer
 Rich Dahm, American television writer
 Sebastian Dahm (born 1987), Danish professional ice hockey player
 Tobias Dahm (born 1987), German athlete specialising in the shot put
 Werner Dahm (1917–2008), German spaceflight scientist
 Nicole, Erica and Jaclyn Dahm (born 1977), American triplet models

See also
 Dahms, surname
 Adolf Dahm-Petersen (1856 – 1922), Norwegian voice specialist and teacher of artistic singing